The golden pebblesnail, scientific name Somatogyrus aureus, is a species of minute freshwater snails with an operculum, aquatic gastropod molluscs or micromolluscs in the family Hydrobiidae. This species is endemic to the United States. The taxonomic status of S. aureus is unclear, as it is morphologically similar to other species.  However, if it is a valid species, it would be assessed as critically endangered.

References

Endemic fauna of the United States
Somatogyrus
Gastropods described in 1865
Taxa named by George Washington Tryon
Taxonomy articles created by Polbot